Özkan is a common Turkish name, and can refer to the following people:

Given name
Özkan Hayırlı (born 1984), Turkish volleyball player
Özkan Karabulut (born 1991), Turkish footballer
Özkan Manav (born 1967), Turkish composer
Özkan Murat (born 1957, Turkish Cypriot politician
Özkan Uğur (born 1953), Turkish pop musician

Surname
Aygül Özkan (born 1971), German politician of Turkish origin
Emre Özkan (born 1988), Turkish footballer
Eriş Özkan (born 1981), Turkish footballer
Esra Özkan (born 1996), Turkish women's footballer
Gabriel Özkan (born 1986), Swedish football player of Assyrian/Syriac descent
Hüseyin Özkan (born 1972), Turkish judoka
Kerem Özkan (born 1988), Turkish basketball player
Mustafa Özkan (born 1975), Turkish footballer
 Ömer Özkan (born 1971), Turkish plastic surgeon
Serdar Özkan (born 1987), Turkish footballer
Sibel Özkan (born 1988), Turkish female weightlifter
Sinan Özkan (born 1986), Turkish football player
Yavuz Özkan (born 1937), Turkish coach and former footballer

Other uses
Mazhar-Fuat-Özkan, Turkish band
Özkan, Emirdağ, a village in Emirdağ district of Afyonkarahisar Province, Turkey

See also 
 Özcan

Turkish-language surnames
Turkish masculine given names